Éveline Gélinas is a French-speaking Canadian actress who grew up in Saint-Boniface, Quebec, near Shawinigan.

She was born in 1974 and graduated from Séminaire Sainte-Marie in 1991. She was nominated for a Genie Award for Best Supporting Actress for her role in The Necessities of Life (Ce qu'il faut pour vivre).

She is married to actor Vincent-Guillaume Otis.

Career
Her credits include:

Television

 1990-1992: Jamais deux sans toi (Lisa Tardif)
 1992-1993: L'Or et le papier (Rose-Anne Miron)
 1993-1999: Ent'Cadieux (Josette Fortin)
 1994-1997: Les Héritiers Duval (Lisa Bard)
 1998-2000: L'Ombre de l'épervier (Marie-Pierre)
 2003-2017: L'Auberge du chien noir (Charlène, des Westerners)
 2017: Ruptures (Emma)
 2019: Victor Lessard (Ghislaine Corbeil)
 2020-2022: District 31 (Alexandra Paradis)
 2023: Alertes (Cindy Castonguay)

Theatre
 2001 : Les Parapluies de Cherbourg (Geneviève Émery)
 2002-2005 : L'homme de la Mancha (Aldonza/Dulcinea)
 2003 : Kamouraska (Élisabeth D'Aulnières)
 2003 : La nature même d'un continent (Billye)
 2004 : Honey Pie (Honey Pie)
 2004 : Les Fourberies de Scapin (Zerbinette)
 2004 : Le peintre des madones ou la naissance d'un tableau (Marie-Paule)
 2004 : Manic : Dans l'œil du Québec
 2005 : La Tempête (Miranda)
 2005 : Une ardente patience (Béatriz)
 2007 : Don Juan (Charlotte)

Animated Series
2008 : Blaise le blasé : Violenne Voula (voice)
2009-10: The Dating Guy: Sam

References

External links

1974 births
Living people
20th-century Canadian actresses
21st-century Canadian actresses
Canadian television actresses
Canadian film actresses
Canadian stage actresses
Actresses from Quebec
French Quebecers
People from Mauricie
Séminaire Sainte-Marie alumni